Tarur-II is a village in the Palakkad district, state of Kerala, India. It forms a part of Tarur gram panchayat, together with Tarur-I.

Demographics
 India census, Tarur-II had a population of 8,607 with 4,269 males and 4,338 females.

References

Villages in Palakkad district